Trucker's Woman (also released as Truckin' Man) is a 1975 action film directed by Will Zens and starring Michael Hawkins.

Plot
A middle-aged man who drops out of college to go undercover as a truck driver in order to solve the mysterious murder of his trucker father.

Production
The film was shot over three weeks in November 1974 in Florence and Society Hill, South Carolina.

Release
The film was originally called Truckin' Man, and was screened under that title for the first six months of its theatrical release (appearing on a double bill with Hot Summer in Barefoot County).  The distributor felt that changing it to Trucker's Woman would result in higher box office returns.

Home media

One of the home media distributors was Troma Entertainment, in 1983 on videocassette. The cover of this release (below), featured new photography of models not resembling the actual actors in the film.

Legacy

In 2018, the film was subject to a comedic running commentary by RiffTrax's Mike Nelson, Kevin Murphy and Bill Corbett.

Trucker's Woman also contains a mysterious, random image of a pepperoni pizza lying on a wooden deck that appears for a single frame in the middle of a brake line checking scene, at 1:08:38 (or 1:00:51 in the RiffTrax version, which, based on the shorter runtime and lack of R-rated material, seems to be based on a television edit). Due to the vignetting effect which was applied to it, it appears that the insertion of this frame was not accidental, but rather was an attempt to subliminally influence audiences to buy pizza (e.g. from drive-in theater concession stands).

See also
 List of American films of 1975
The Starfighters - the 1964 Air Force film also directed by Zens that was spoofed by MST3K

References

External links

Excerpt

1975 films
1970s crime films
American independent films
Trucker films
Troma Entertainment films
Films directed by Will Zens
1970s rediscovered films
Rediscovered American films
1970s English-language films
1970s American films